Ahmed Cheheima (born April 8, 1992) is an Algerian footballer who last played for RC Arbaâ in the Algerian Ligue Professionnelle 1.

Cheheima was part of the Algeria national under-17 football team that finished as runner-ups at the 2009 African U-17 Championship.

External links
 

1992 births
Algerian footballers
Algerian Ligue Professionnelle 1 players
Algerian Ligue 2 players
Living people
People from Bouïra Province
JSM Béjaïa players
USM Alger players
Association football defenders
Algeria youth international footballers
21st-century Algerian people